Awa (or variants) may refer to:

People
 Awa (given name), notable people named Awa or Hawa
 Awá (Brazil), an indigenous people of Brazil
 Awa-Kwaiker, an indigenous people of Colombia and Ecuador

Languages
 Awa language (China) or Wa (Va) language, language of the Wa people of Burma and China
 Awa language (Papua New Guinea), a Kainantu language of Papua New Guinea
 Awa Pit language, a Barbacoan language spoken by the Awa-Kwaiker people in Colombia and Ecuador
 Awadhi language (ISO 639 code: awa), an Eastern Hindi language spoken in northern India
 Guajá language or Awá, the language of the Awá people of Brazil
 Khumi language or Awa, a Kukish language of Burma

Music
 Awa (musician) or Leena Peisa (born 1979), Finish musician
 AWA (singer) or Awa Santesson-Sey (born 1997), Swedish singer
 A-WA, Israeli hip-hop and world music band

Places
 Awa, Tokushima, Japan, a town
 Awa District, Chiba, Japan, a modern geographical administrative division
 Awa District, Tokushima, Japan, a modern geographical administrative division
 Awa Province (Chiba), Japan, a historical geographical administrative division
 Awa Province (Tokushima), Japan, a historical geographical administrative division
 Awa Station, a railway station in Kōchi Prefecture, Japan
 Inwa or Awa, Myanmar, imperial capital of Burmese kingdoms from the 14th to 19th centuries

Other uses
 Awa Society, a mask and initiatory society of the Dogon people of Mali
 Milkfish or awa, a tropical marine fish (Chanos chanos)
 Kava or ʻawa, a plant (Piper methysticum) consumed for its sedating effects throughout Polynesia

See also
 AWA (disambiguation)
 

Language and nationality disambiguation pages